Gibbston is a community in the Wakatipu Basin in the Otago region of the South Island, New Zealand. Through the valley runs the Kawarau River which forms the Kawarau Gorge.

The Gibbston region is the coolest and highest of the Central Otago regions with the majority of land gently sloping to the north. This northerly aspect greatly assists vineyards to grow grapes because of increased sunlight and with a reduced possibility of frost, although this still poses a significant threat.

It was voted community of the year in 2011 due to the work on the Gibbston River Trail.

The Gibbston River Trail and the Gibbston Highway Trail are walking/running and cycling trails that give good access to the wineries in the area but also connect to The Queenstown Trail at the Kawarau Gorge Suspension Bridge.

Often Gibbston is incorrectly called Gibbston Valley or Gibbston Flats due to the land being the only flat usable land in the Kawarau Gorge.

Demographics

Outer Wakatipu had a population of 822 at the 2018 New Zealand census, an increase of 165 people (25.1%) since the 2013 census, and an increase of 285 people (53.1%) since the 2006 census. There were 282 households. There were 420 males and 405 females, giving a sex ratio of 1.04 males per female. The median age was 42.9 years (compared with 37.4 years nationally), with 144 people (17.5%) aged under 15 years, 96 (11.7%) aged 15 to 29, 513 (62.4%) aged 30 to 64, and 69 (8.4%) aged 65 or older.

Ethnicities were 93.4% European/Pākehā, 6.2% Māori, 0.7% Pacific peoples, 2.6% Asian, and 3.6% other ethnicities (totals add to more than 100% since people could identify with multiple ethnicities).

The proportion of people born overseas was 31.4%, compared with 27.1% nationally.

Although some people objected to giving their religion, 66.1% had no religion, 25.9% were Christian, 0.4% were Hindu, 0.4% were Buddhist and 1.8% had other religions.

Of those at least 15 years old, 225 (33.2%) people had a bachelor or higher degree, and 60 (8.8%) people had no formal qualifications. The median income was $51,400, compared with $31,800 nationally. 201 people (29.6%) earned over $70,000 compared to 17.2% nationally. The employment status of those at least 15 was that 432 (63.7%) people were employed full-time, 126 (18.6%) were part-time, and 3 (0.4%) were unemployed.

Vineyards and wineries in the area 

 Brennan Wines
 Chard Farm
 Coal Pit Wines
 Gibbston Highgate Estate
 Gibbston Valley Wines
 Hawkshead
 Kinross
 Mt Edward
 Mt Rosa
 Nevis Bluff
 Peregrine Wines
 Two Paddocks
 Valli Vineyards
 Waitiri Creek Wines

Grape varieties grown in the area include: Chardonnay, Pinot Gris, Riesling, Sauvignon Blanc and Pinot Noir. Lesser known (and grown in smaller quantities) are the varieties of Gamay, Gewürztraminer, Pinot Blanc and Pinot Meunier.

See also 
Gibbston Valley & Queenstown Vineyards and Wineries

References 

Populated places in Otago
Wine regions of New Zealand